Bathory is the debut studio album by Swedish extreme metal band Bathory. It was released in October 1984, through Tyfon Grammofon. It is considered by fans and critics to be one of the contenders for the first black metal record.

Background and recording 
Bathory was formed in 1983. The band's frontman, Quorthon, worked part-time at the small record label Tyfon. In late 1983 and early 1984, the label was putting together a compilation of songs by Scandinavian metal bands. However, at the last minute, one of the bands backed out. Tyfon agreed to let Bathory appear on the record as a replacement, and the band recorded two songs for the compilation—"Sacrifice" and "The Return of the Darkness and Evil"—in January. The album, Scandinavian Metal Attack, was released in March 1984 and was Bathory's first appearance on record. To everyone's surprise, over 95 percent of fan mail sent to the label after the record's release was dedicated to Bathory. Tyfon asked the band to record a full-length album. His bandmates having moved away, Quorthon recruited Rickard Bergman as bassist and Stefan Larsson as drummer. On 22 May 1984, they had their first and only rehearsal together before recording the album. Here they recorded the songs "Satan My Master" and "Witchcraft", which would later appear on the compilation album Jubileum Volume III.

On 14 June the band entered Heavenshore Studio in Stockholm—a converted garage—to record the debut. The studio had a homemade eight-channel tape recorder. Due to the band's tight budget, they ran the recorder at half-speed to fit everything on one master tape. They also had to work quickly – the recording and mixing were done in somewhere between 32 and 56 hours.

Album artwork 
The album was originally to be named Pentagrammaton and to have a pentagram on the cover, but this name was scrapped when several people misread it as Pentagon. The pentagram was moved to the back and replaced with a re-touched portion of a drawing made by Joseph A. Smith in 1981 for the book Witches by Erica Jong. For the writing on the back cover, Quorthon bought a set of rub-on letters in the Old English font; however, he was one letter short ('C'), and as a result, the second 'C' in "Necromancy" was replaced with an 'S'. The introduction, "Storm of Damnation", and the outro was also mistakenly left off the track listing.

The goat on the album cover, taken from a drawing by Joseph Smith, was originally meant to be printed in gold. However, this was too expensive to use, so Quorthon asked for it to be as near to gold as possible; the result was a bright yellow color. According to Swedish Death Metal, Quorthon thought it looked "awful", and after the first 1000 pressings it was switched to black-and-white. The yellow cover has become a collector's item, and is now well known as "Gula Geten" ("The Yellow Goat").

Musical style 
Daniel Ekeroth, author of the book Swedish Death Metal, described the album's style as "basically a mix of the Satanic party rock of Venom and the energy of San Francisco thrash metal". While Bathory leader Quorthon claimed to have not heard Venom before making the album and to be inspired by Black Sabbath, Motörhead, Sex Pistols, and GBH, former drummer Jonas Åkerlund claimed that Bathory was "exclusively" inspired by Venom during these days.

Release and reception 

Bathory was released in October 1984 and sold out its subsequent pressing of 1000 in two weeks. The album has since gained a cult notoriety. Bathory was reissued in 1990 through Black Mark Production.

AllMusic critic Rob Ferrier wrote: "The music itself has a certain lo-fi charm, and if you're into this sort of thing the raw power of this debut cannot be ignored." Also writing for AllMusic, Eduardo Rivadavia has stated that the record and its follow-up The Return…… were "so inaccessible, so unprecedented in their abrasive anti-commercialism, as to be ahead of their time, carving a niche all their own within this quickly developing subgenre." Canadian journalist Martin Popoff called the album "a cruel joke but a historically poignant one" and remarked how, despite striving "to be the leading edge of repellent extreme", Quorthon's debut is very musical "versus the black-hearted Norwegian acts" that would cite him as a main influence.

Track listing

Personnel 
 Bathory
 Quorthon (Thomas Börje Forsberg) – vocals, guitar, production
 Stefan Larsson – drums
 Rickard Bergman – bass guitar

 Production
 The Boss (Börje Forsberg) – engineering, production

References

Sources

External links
 

Bathory (band) albums
Black metal albums by Swedish artists
1984 debut albums